WURL (760 AM) is a radio station broadcasting a Southern Gospel music format. Licensed to Moody, Alabama, United States, the station serves the eastern area of the Birmingham metropolitan area.  The station is currently owned by The Bill Davidson Evangelistic Association.

760 AM is a United States clear-channel frequency on which WJR in Detroit, Michigan is the dominant Class A station;  WURL must leave the air from sunset to sunrise to protect the nighttime skywave signal of WJR.

References

External links

URL
Southern Gospel radio stations in the United States
Radio stations established in 1983
URL
URL
1983 establishments in Alabama